Orma is a variety of the Oromo language spoken by the Orma people in Kenya. It is a dialect of Southern Oromo.

References

Hoskins (2011) Phonology of the Orma language

Languages of Kenya

Oromo groups